DYBG (91.7 FM), broadcasting as 91.7 Ben FM, is a radio station owned and operated by Manila Broadcasting Company. Its studio is located at Brgy. Curva, Medellin, Cebu.

The station was formerly part of Radyo Natin Network from 2002 to 2018.

References

Radio stations in Cebu
Radio stations established in 2018